The following is a list of players, both past and current, who appeared at least in one game for the Blackwater Bossing PBA franchise. Statistics are accurate as of the 2023 PBA Governors' Cup.

Players

|-
| align=left| || align=left| || G/F || align=left| || 1 ||  || 13 || 139 || 33 || 19 || 7 || 
|-
| align=left| || align=left| || G/F || align=left| || 1 ||  || 22 || 304 || 103 || 44 || 14 || 
|-
| align=left| || align=left| || C || align=left| || 1 ||  || 3 || 6 || 2 || 0 || 0 || 
|-
| align=left| || align=left| || G/F || align=left| || 1 ||  || 13 || 115 || 42 || 28 || 9 || 
|-
| align=left| || align=left| || F || align=left| || 1 ||  || 26 || 315 || 135 || 63 || 11 || 
|-
| align=left| || align=left| || C || align=left| || 2 || – || 44 || 595 || 219 || 97 || 12 || 
|-
| align=left| || align=left| || G || align=left| || 1 ||  || 22 || 197 || 47 || 21 || 20 || 
|-
| align=left| || align=left| || F/C || align=left| || 1 || 2022 || 5 || 20 || 7 || 3 || 0 || 
|-
| bgcolor=#cfecec align=left|^ || align=left| || G || align=left| || 2 || –present || 49 || 1,181 || 467 || 102 || 133 || 
|-
| align=left| || align=left| || G || align=left| || 1 ||  || 11 || 210 || 72 || 20 || 27 || 
|-
| align=left| || align=left| || G/F || align=left| || 1 ||  || 6 || 64 || 7 || 13 || 4 || 
|-
| bgcolor=#cfecec align=left|^ || align=left| || G || align=left| || 2 || 2022–present || 32 || 333 || 156 || 36 || 37 || 
|-
| align=left| || align=left| || C || align=left| || 2 || – || 40 || 628 || 108 || 203 || 18 || 
|-
| align=left| || align=left| || G || align=left| || 1 || 2021–2022 || 7 || 74 || 31 || 17 || 5 || 
|-
| bgcolor=#cfecec align=left|^ || align=left| || F || align=left| || 1 || –present || 22 || 510 || 126 || 57 || 46 || 
|-
| align=left| || align=left| || G || align=left| || 3 || – || 39 || 344 || 88 || 46 || 29 || 
|-
| align=left| || align=left| || F || align=left| || 4 || – || 101 || 2,551 || 1,137 || 517 || 158 || 
|-
| bgcolor="#FFCC00" align=left|+ || align=left| || F/C || align=left| || 1 ||  || 3 || 104 || 44 || 40 || 1 || 
|-
| bgcolor="#FFCC00" align=left|+ || align=left| || F || align=left| || 1 ||  || 10 || 372 || 180 || 131 || 56 || 
|-
| bgcolor="#FFCC00" align=left|+ || align=left| || F || align=left| || 1 ||  || 5 || 188 || 60 || 63 || 8 || 
|-
| align=left| || align=left| || G || align=left| || 1 ||  || 25 || 414 || 162 || 57 || 34 || 
|-
| align=left| || align=left| || F || align=left| || 2 || – || 28 || 394 || 77 || 60 || 14 || 
|-
| align=left| || align=left| || G || align=left| || 2 || – || 30 || 450 || 101 || 54 || 75 || 
|-
| align=left| || align=left| || F || align=left| || 4 || – || 49 || 1,041 || 411 || 155 || 40 || 
|-
| bgcolor=#cfecec align=left|^ || align=left| || G || align=left| || 2 || –present || 31 || 748 || 343 || 65 || 98 || 
|-
| align=left| || align=left| || F || align=left| || 1 ||  || 4 || 36 || 12 || 5 || 4 || 
|-
| align=left| || align=left| || G/F || align=left| || 1 ||  || 24 || 410 || 110 || 34 || 29 || 
|-
| align=left| || align=left| || F || align=left| || 3 || – || 66 || 1,141 || 560 || 160 || 50 || 
|-
| align=left| || align=left| || G || align=left| || 1 || 2021–2022 || 8 || 78 || 19 || 4 || 4 || 
|-
| align=left| || align=left| || F || align=left| || 1 ||  || 1 || 11 || 0 || 1 || 0 || 
|-
| align=left| || align=left| || G || align=left| || 3 || – || 80 || 1,674 || 437 || 202 || 204 || 
|-
| bgcolor="#FFCC00" align=left|+ || align=left| || C || align=left| || 1 ||  || 4 || 183 || 91 || 52 || 6 || 
|-
| align=left| || align=left| || F || align=left| || 2 || ,  || 18 || 393 || 126 || 50 || 12 || 
|-
| align=left| || align=left| || G || align=left| || 2 || – || 37 || 498 || 116 || 52 || 58 || 
|-
| align=left| || align=left| || G || align=left| || 2 || – || 26 || 628 || 222 || 103 || 69 || 
|-
| align=left| || align=left| || G || align=left| || 2 || – || 16 || 195 || 58 || 11 || 32 || 
|-
| bgcolor="#FFCC00" align=left|+ || align=left| || C || align=left| || 1 ||  || 6 || 233 || 109 || 91 || 28 || 
|-
| align=left| || align=left| || F || align=left| || 2 || – || 44 || 1,211 || 548 || 237 || 104 || 
|-
| align=left| || align=left| || G || align=left| || 2 || – || 22 || 301 || 47 || 51 || 17 || 
|-
| align=left| || align=left| || G || align=left| || 3 || – || 57 || 943 || 283 || 160 || 57 || 
|-
| bgcolor=#cfecec align=left|^ || align=left| || G || align=left| || 4 || ––present || 98 || 2,619 || 1,125 || 241 || 167 || 
|-
| bgcolor="#FFCC00" align=left|+ || align=left| || C || align=left| || 1 ||  || 17 || 739 || 362 || 233 || 61 || 
|-
| bgcolor=#cfecec align=left|^ || align=left| || F || align=left| || 1 || –present || 12 || 100 || 32 || 28 || 6 || 
|-
| align=left| || align=left| || F/C || align=left| || 2 || – || 33 || 599 || 156 || 135 || 28 || 
|-
| align=left| || align=left| || F || align=left| || 1 ||  || 2 || 14 || 0 || 4 || 0 || 
|-
| align=left| || align=left| || G || align=left nowrap| || 1 ||  || 11 || 381 || 151 || 31 || 45 || 
|-
| align=left| || align=left nowrap| || F || align=left| || 1 ||  || 7 || 69 || 34 || 21 || 4 || 
|-
| align=left| || align=left| || C || align=left| || 4 || – || 103 || 2,426 || 939 || 736 || 104 || 
|-
| bgcolor=cfecec align=left|^ || align=left| || F || align=left| || 3 || –present || 48 || 571 || 158 || 83 || 19 || 
|-
| bgcolor="#FFCC00" align=left|+ || align=left| || C || align=left| || 1 ||  || 6 || 242 || 158 || 110 || 10 || 
|-
| align=left| || align=left| || F/C || align=left| || 1 ||  || 27 || 671 || 259 || 157 || 23 || 
|-
| align=left| || align=left| || G/F || align=left| || 1 ||  || 10 || 76 || 21 || 7 || 6 || 
|-
| bgcolor="#FFCC00" align=left|+ || align=left| || F || align=left| || 1 ||  || 1 || 37 || 26 || 10 || 3 || 
|-
| align=left| || align=left| || F/C || align=left| || 2 || – || 13 || 83 || 36 || 19 || 1 || 
|-
| align=left| || align=left| || F || align=left| || 3 || – || 94 || 1,836 || 629 || 308 || 89 || 
|-
| align=left nowrap| || align=left| || F/C || align=left| || 1 ||  || 8 || 153 || 89 || 28 || 5 || 
|-
| bgcolor="#FFCC00" align=left|+ || align=left| || F || align=left| || 2 || 2022–present || 14 || 559 || 377 || 146 || 55 || 
|-
| align=left| || align=left| || G || align=left| || 1 ||  || 12 || 99 || 43 || 7 || 6 || 
|-
| align=left| || align=left| || F/C || align=left| || 4 || –– || 47 || 610 || 135 || 125 || 25 || 
|-
| align=left| || align=left| || G || align=left| || 2 ||  || 30 || 939|| 287 || 130 || 146 || 
|-
| bgcolor=#cfecec align=left|^ || align=left| || F || align=left| || 1 || –present || 11 || 129 || 61 || 15 || 3 || 
|-
| bgcolor=#cfecec align=left|^ || align=left| || G || align=left| || 1 || –present || 11 || 192 || 103 || 26 || 41 || 
|-
| bgcolor=#cfecec align=left|^ || align=left| || G || align=left| || 1 || –present || 12 || 241 || 77 || 22 || 14 || 
|-
| align=left| || align=left| || F/C || align=left| || 2 || – || 38 || 370 || 119 || 66 || 15 || 
|-
| align=left| || align=left| || F || align=left| || 2 || – || 48 || 574 || 227 || 260 || 32 || 
|-
| bgcolor="#FFCC00" align=left|+ || align=left| || F || align=left| || 1 ||  || 3 || 91 || 60 || 29 || 9 || 
|-
| bgcolor="#FFCC00" align=left|+ || align=left| || C || align=left| || 1 ||  || 12 || 484 || 229 || 195 || 68 || 
|-
| align=left| || align=left| || G || align=left| || 1 ||  || 34 || 891 || 612 || 104 || 82 || 
|-
| align=left| || align=left| || F || align=left| || 1 ||  || 32 || 604 || 153 || 113 || 25 || 
|-
| align=left| || align=left| || F/C || align=left| || 2 || – || 20 || 351 || 96 || 88 || 8 || 
|-
| align=left| || align=left| || G/F || align=left| || 3 || – || 68 || 1,757 || 869 || 329 || 123 || 
|-
| align=left| || align=left| || F/C || align=left| || 2 || – || 21 || 227 || 66 || 46 || 6 || 
|-
| align=left| || align=left| || F/C || align=left| || 1 ||  || 5 || 55 || 22 || 10 || 2 || 
|-
| bgcolor=#cfecec align=left|^ || align=left| || G || align=left| || 2 || –present || 41 || 1,060.4 || 342 || 123 || 136 || 
|-
| align=left| || align=left| || F || align=left| || 2 || – || 13 || 129 || 55 || 25 || 6 || 
|-
| align=left| || align=left| || G || align=left| || 2 || 2022,  || 24 || 382 || 43 || 54 || 41 || 
|-
| align=left| || align=left| || G || align=left| || 1 ||  || 10 || 158 || 62 || 17 || 11 || 
|-
| align=left| || align=left| || G || align=left| || 2 || – || 30 || 400 || 116 || 49 || 49 || 
|-
| align=left| || align=left| || F/C || align=left| || 1 || 2021–2022 || 8 || 234 || 86 || 66 || 10 || 
|-
| align=left| || align=left| || F || align=left| || 1 ||  || 3 || 9 || 0 || 0 || 0 || 
|-
| align=left| || align=left| || G/F || align=left| || 1 ||  || 15 || 229 || 89 || 21 || 20 || 
|-
| align=left| || align=left| || G || align=left| || 2 || – || 27 || 271 || 85 || 46 || 14 || 
|-
| align=left| || align=left| || F/C || align=left| || 1 || 2021–2022 || 19 || 180 || 41 || 28 || 3 || 
|-
| align=left| || align=left| || G || align=left| || 1 ||  || 23 || 854 || 491 || 145 || 80 || 
|-
| align=left| || align=left| || F/C || align=left| || 2 || – || 45 || 876 || 252 || 180 || 25 || 
|-
| align=left| || align=left| || F/G || align=left| || 1 ||  || 1 || 4 || 0 || 0 || 0 || 
|-
| align=left| || align=left| || F/C || align=left| || 1 ||  || 3 || 8 || 0 || 5 || 0 || 
|-
| align=left| || align=left| || G || align=left| || 3 || – || 71 || 1,601 || 467 || 222 || 272 || 
|-
| bgcolor=#cfecec align=left|^ || align=left| || F || align=left| || 1 || –present || 12 || 101 || 28 || 17 || 4 || 
|-
| bgcolor="#FFCC00" align=left|+ || align=left| || G || align=left| || 1 ||  || 6 || 87 || 23 || 15 || 14 || 
|-
| align=left| || align=left| || G || align=left| || 2 || – || 53 || 829 || 272 || 62 || 57 || 
|-
| bgcolor="#FFCC00" align=left|+ || align=left| || C || align=left| || 1 ||  || 11 || 465 ||  208 || 184 || 33 || 
|-
| align=left| || align=left| || F || align=left| || 1 ||  || 10 || 160 || 35 || 54 || 8 || 
|-
| bgcolor=#cfecec align=left|^ || align=left| || F || align=left| || 1 || –present || 10 || 266 || 103 || 37 || 16 || 
|-
| align=left| || align=left| || G/F || align=left| || 2 || – || 18 || 101 || 44 || 14 || 3 || 
|-
| align=left| || align=left| || G/F || align=left| || 1 ||  || 20 || 309 || 119 || 34 || 8 || 
|-
| align=left| || align=left| || F/C || align=left| || 1 ||  || 5 || 72 || 5 || 17 || 4 || 
|-
| bgcolor=#cfecec align=left|^ || align=left| || F/C || align=left| || 5 || ––present || 145 || 2,147 || 606 || 363 || 122 || 
|-
| align=left| || align=left| || C || align=left| || 1 ||  || 3 || 23 || 2 || 2 || 0 || 
|-
| bgcolor="#FFCC00" align=left|+ || align=left| || G/F || align=left| || 1 ||  || 3 || 75 || 49 || 17 || 4 || 
|-
| bgcolor="#FFCC00" align=left|+ || align=left| || C ||align=left| || 2 ||  || 14 || 606 || 361 || 298 || 62 || 
|-
| bgcolor="#FFCC00" align=left|+ || align=left| || C || align=left| || 1 ||  || 6 || 236 || 133 || 132 || 17 || 
|-
| bgcolor=#cfecec align=left|^ || align=left| || G || align=left| || 2 || 2022–present || 38 || 685 || 292 || 107 || 47 || 
|-
| align=left| || align=left| || G || align=left| || 5 || – || 117 || 2,312 || 922 || 274 || 361 || 
|-
| bgcolor=cfecec align=left|^ || align=left| || C || align=left| || 1 || –present || 30 || 554 || 198 || 177 || 54 || 
|-
| align=left| || align=left| || G || align=left| || 1 ||  || 22 || 241 || 42 || 17 || 20 || 
|-
| align=left| || align=left| || G || align=left| || 2 || – || 20 || 205 || 66 || 20 || 19 || 
|-
| align=left| || align=left| || G || align=left| || 3 || – || 26 || 544 || 237 || 64 || 62 || 
|-
| bgcolor=cfecec align=left|^ || align=left| || G || align=left| || 2 || –present || 29 || 325 || 110 || 51 || 12 || 
|-
| align=left| || align=left| || F/C || align=left| || 1 ||  || 20 || 395 || 152 || 93 || 11 || 
|-
| align=left| || align=left| || G/F || align=left| || 2 || – || 13 || 387 || 175 || 108 || 23 || 
|-
| bgcolor=cfecec align=left|^ || align=left| || F || align=left| || 1 || –present || 34 || 945 || 380 || 308 || 30 || 
|-
| align=left| || align=left| || G || align=left| || 1 ||  || 13 || 103 || 18 || 6 || 8 || 
|-
| bgcolor="#FFCC00" align=left|+ || align=left| || G/F || align=left| || 2 || – || 27 || 1,102 || 645 || 373 || 134 || 
|-
| align=left| || align=left| || F || align=left| || 1 || 2021–2022 || 9 || 115 || 14 || 16 || 8 || 
|-
| bgcolor="#FFCC00" align=left|+ || align=left| || F || align=left| || 1 || nowrap|–present || 3 || 112 || 117 || 35 || 17 || 
|-
| align=left| || align=left| || G || align=left| || 1 ||  || 19 || 433 || 195 || 69 || 28 || 
|}

References 

Blackwater Bossing players